Air Force Station Kanchrapara is a military airfield located near Kanchrapara, in the North 24 Parganas district in West Bengal, India.

History
Air Force Station Kanchrapara was established on September 1, 1942.
During September–c. 4 October 1945 World War II, the airfield was used as a reconnaissance base by the 8th Reconnaissance Group of The United States Army Air Forces Tenth Air Force. It was home to several P-51 Mustang, B-25 Mitchell and P-38 Lightning airframes during that time. After World War II, this airstrip was closed and left abandoned.

The airfield was re-activated in December 2014, when the Indian Air Force inaugurated its 5th Selection Board at the Air Force Station. 
An old MIG-21 has been brought here for a showcase, it can be seen from the main gate.

See also

 List of airports by ICAO code: V#VA VE VI VO - India
 List of airports in India
 List of airports in West Bengal

References

 Maurer, Maurer (1983). Air Force Combat Units Of World War II. Maxwell AFB, Alabama: Office of Air Force History. .

World War II sites in India
Airports in West Bengal
North 24 Parganas district
1942 establishments in India